Julianos Kattinis (born 1934) is a Greek painter who lives and works in Rome, Italy.

Biography 
He was born in Damascus in 1934 to Theodoros Katinis and Despina Peridakis.

His father worked as a Greek engineer and built roads in the Middle East, causing his family to move often.

The Middle East 
He attended the French private school “Frères Lazaristes” in Damascus, and spent long periods in Jerusalem, Cairo and Amman.
In Damascus, Kattinis took an active part in the cultural and intellectual life of the time. He  was strongly attracted by the Archeological Museum of Damascus and Palmira,  full of  Mesopotamian, Greek, and Roman Art, from which he absorbed much of his inspiration and imagination for his work.
The town of Deir ez-Zor  near the Euphrates and Maaloula  were a source of stimulation for his artistic life. The sky of the desert and the white and terracotta colors of Maaloula strongly attracted him and affected his way of painting.
In 1957  he was invited by the Egyptian Cultural Center of Damascus [1] for his first exhibition.
In 1961 the  Modern Art Gallery in Damascus  invited him to exhibit his work at the  Salon National de Printemps and Salon d’Automne, where he could display the variety of forms and techniques he had long experimented.

Europe 
In 1961  Kattinis decided to leave the Middle East to go to Europe, wanting to engage in the culture of 60s Europe.
He settled in Rome, the town that mostly suited his idea of beauty, and here he attended the Academy of Fine Arts, where he met and made friends with his teachers, the famous painters Mario Mafai, Nino Maccari, and Giuseppe  Canali, and in 1964 got his Diploma in Fine Arts.
In the same year he took part in the XXXII International Venice Biennal of Art  with his abstract painting [2], extremely in vogue during that time in Italy.
During the long periods spent in several  European towns such as Paris, Athens, Vienna, Genève, Munich, Innsbruck, he visited their museums and came into contact with the cultural life of other countries. All this strongly affected him, causing a more independent turn of his painting into a personal sort of expressionism.
He went back to the Middle East in 1965, invited by the French Cultural Center in Amman (Jordan) for a solo exhibition [3] and, in Beirut (Lebanon), for a solo exhibition at  the Amateur d’Art  gallery. In addition, the Sursock Museum of Beirut invited him for a group exhibition [4] where he had an opportunity to meet and confront artists of different countries.
A year spent in Innsbruck (Austria) (1967–68), surrounded by the beauty of the white mountains that strongly inspired him, gave way to a new phase of his art, where symbolism and expressionism merge into strongly colored images of landscapes and human beings.
Captured by Kattinis’ way of painting, Hans Lang Beton Firm in Innsbruck  commissioned him a large, oil painting on plywood [6]
On this occasion Professor Heinz von Mackovitz wrote of him “ …Kattinis’ colors light up and shine with a brightness full of tension, without becoming violent, so that Kattinis’ painting  arouses in the spectators a feeling of perpetual forces...”  [7]

Italy and Rome
When he  went back to Italy, Kattinis set up his studio in  Trastevere Rome, where, in 1969, the Poliedro gallery  invited him for a solo exhibition which was introduced by writings of the famous poets, writers and journalists  Leonardo Sinisgalli,  Ugo Mannoni , Renato Civello and Giancarlo Fusco.
It was an extremely lively time in Rome, one of the European cinema’s most fertile periods, when many artists from all over the world lived and worked in Trastevere and Via Margutta.
The American psychologist Giorgina Nathan Burdett got interested in his work and organized an exhibition in her studio.  John Hart of the Daily American wrote: “... Kattinis has limitless imagination and prolific technical command, which lets him treat solemn themes with seemingly irreverent levity...” [8]

In 1972 Kattinis was invited at the  famous  Museum Palazzo Braschi of Rome, for a solo exhibition of his paintings, where the figure of man, fixed out of his temporal significance, becomes a dominant theme of his work.

The art critic Rolando Meconi curated the catalog and the issuing of Kattinis’ first album of handmade linoleum etchings  in relief “Vasi Antichi“ [9]

In the following year appeared his beautiful  album of 6 handmade linoleum etchings “GLI ASTRONAUTI” edited by IL  Poliedro  and  accompanied by an introduction of Leonardo Sinisgalli [10] and writings of Sandra Giannattasio, Pietro Bianchi, Heinz Von Mackowitz.

In 1977 the Greek government organized a retrospective of his work at the  Municipal Theatre (Dimotikò Thèatro) of Piraeus- Athens (Greece), and later on at Kyklos Gallery in Thessaloniki (Greece). Curator: the Greek art critic Eleni Gyzi,  with articles on the Greek art magazine Kaleidoscope and Greek newspapers.[11]
In Italy he was commissioned an oil painting on iron for one of the twelve doors  of the old stadium by  the Municipality of Bari and the Greek Embassy of Rome(1997)  [12]
In 2002 Kattinis was invited by  The Municipality of Pisa – for an exhibition entitled ”Cantami o Diva” held in  Santacroce in Fossabanda in  Pisa and in  Montecatini (Italy). [13]
In 2003   the ( Magi’ 900) Museo d’Arte delle Generazioni Italiane del 900. G. Bargellini  published the catalog  “ 4  MAESTRI  DELL‘INCISIONE” with the pictures of all Kattinis’ highly skilled etchings and engravings . Nicola Micieli  wrote   “…what mostly  characterizes Kattinis’ scheme of printing, revealing his vision of the world, is his informal method used in combining and manipulating different graphic and chalcographic techniques within the same piece of work...”    [14]
During the years he has been commissioned exterior and interior large murals and frescoes, among which the three large frescoes inside the suites of “ Le Fabbre – Fattoria  Pianetti  (Manciano) Italy,  inspired by the spirit of the ancient Etruscan civilization [15], together with a beautiful album of 12 multicolor etchings “ Gli Etruschi” [16]
One of his works has just appeared within the exhibition entitled “Pittori del ‘900 e Carte da  Gioco”,      organized by  Museo di Roma  Palazzo Braschi  [17]

Notes

References 

 1) Catalog: la Galerie ESPACE Sous le patronage du Ministre de la culture et de l’orientation  2 OCT. 1965
 2) XXXII Biennale Internazionale d’Arte di Venezia   SAC [Archivio Storico delle Arti Contemporanee] Fondazione La Biennale di Venezia   OPAC SBN 32. biennale internazionale d'arte Venezia  S.l. : 1964 – 322 p.; Bolaffi d’arte moderna 1964  ed. Giulio Bolaffi  p. 159
 3) Catalog: CENTRE CULTUREL FRANCAIS – AMMAN  Sous le patronage du ministre d’etat M.Said Dajani  27 Nov. 1965
 4) Expo des Artistes- Musée Sursock –Coshran Beiut –Lebanon 1966
 5) Catalog: GALERIE ZENDRUM 107 – Innsbruck,(Austria ) Sadrach 33     20 marz 1968
 6) Hans Lang Beton Firm- oil painting on wood, 6x2m (commissioned by the management) Tiroler Tageszeitung  11  Marz   1968  number 59; Dachauer  22 June 1968 No 96 by Karl Lemke; Tiroler Nachrichten 25 Marz 1968 number 70 by H.C.P.
 7) Tirolen  Nachrichten   19 June 1968  number 139        by  Prof Heinz von Mackovitz
 8) Daily American         Sunday- Monday,     May 25–26, 1975   by John Hart
 9)  Catalog:  MUSEO DI ROMA – PALAZZO BRASCHI   S.P.Q.R.Curator Rolando Meconi Album of multicolor original etchings  “Vasi Antichi”   Ed.Il Triangolo Roma   1972 
 10)  Gli Astronauti     Ed. Il Poliedro,   Roma 1973 
 11) Catalog: ed . Kaleidoskopio. Curator: the Greek art critic Eleni Gyzi     Athens 1976–1977 Kaleidoskopio Magazine-  Athens 1976    p. 27   by Eleni Gyzi   www.worldcut.org   (Julianos  Kattinis)
 12) In the project “Le porte del Mediterraneo”,on the occasion of the XIII  Mediterranean Sport Games, Kattinis represented  Greece of the 12 Mediterranean countries –   Bari 1997.
 13) “Cantami o Diva…”   Pisa, aprile 2002   Montecatini Terme, agosto –settembre 2002  Comune di Pisa [opac SBN] [IT\ICCU\MOD\0807844]       or    Julianos Kattinis  Internet Culturale
 14) Magi’900      Confronti da Museo – 4 Maestri dell’Incisione,   - curated by Nicola Micieli  Bologna ed. Bora, [2003] [opac SBN]  [IT\ICCU\RER\0099384]        or    Julianos Kattinis  Internet Culturale
 15) “ The four Elements – Water, Earth, Fire, Air” “The two Words” ”Paradise” Giornale dell’Arte “  Supplemento a “ Il giornale dell’Arte” N. 227, Dicembre 2003”
 16) “GLI ETRUSCHI IERI, OGGI E DOMANI”  ED. TIPOGRAFIA AQUILAGRAFICA  Roma  Guzzetti, 2008           [ 
 17) “PITTORI DEL 9OO E CARTE DA GIOCO” La collezione di Paola Masino – 14 dic.2016 Museo di Roma Palazzo Braschi.

External links 
 Official website: http://www.julianoskattinis.it

1934 births
Living people
Greek painters
People from Damascus